Bosa is a town and comune in the province of Oristano (until May 2005 it was in the province of Nuoro), part of the Sardinia region of Italy. The town has maintained a population of around 8,000 people for a significant amount of time, but has an urban character that has differentiated it from other locations in Sardinia. Agriculture and fishing play an important part in the city economy, thanks to the river valley near the coast surrounded by hills and highland plateaus.

History
The area was inhabited since prehistorical times, as attested by the presence of several domus de janas and nuraghe. It was probably founded by the Phoenicians, although little is known about the original settlement. Under the Romans it was a municipium. The present town of Bosa was founded in XIII century by the Malaspina family, 2 km (1 miles) from the site of the ancient town In the early Middle Ages, as part of the Giudicato of Logudoro, it was a provincial capital. After the construction of the Malaspina Castle, the population gradually moved from the seaside to the hills.

It remained  in the hands of the Malaspina until the 14th century when it was taken over by the Crown of Aragon. Along with the rest of Sardinia, it was later ruled by Spain. For a short period in between it was a part of the Giudicato of Arborea.

Bosa is known for a classical way of saying: you do like they do in Bosa: if it rains, they let it rains

Sources and references

External links 

 On Line Guide
 Conoscibosa Tourist information 
 Bosa Guide 
 BOSAinfo tourist information